The Pahang State Legislative Assembly is the unicameral state legislature of the Malaysian state of Pahang. It is composed of 42 members representing single-member constituencies throughout the state.

The Assembly convenes at the Wisma Seri Pahang in the state capital, Kuantan.

Current composition

Seating arrangement

Role
As the state's legislative body, the Pahang State Legislative Assembly's main function is to enact laws that apply to Pahang, known as enactments. The Speaker presides over the Assembly's proceedings, and works to maintain order during debates.

The state government's executive branch (known as the State Executive Council (EXCO), or Majlis Mesyuarat Kerajaan Negeri), including the Menteri Besar, are drawn from the Assembly. The Menteri Besar is ceremonially appointed by the Sultan of Pahang on the basis that he is able to command a majority in the Assembly. The Menteri Besar then appoints members of the State EXCO drawing from members of the Assembly.

Pahang state elections, 2022

Pahang state elections, 2018

|-
! style="background-color:#E9E9E9;text-align:left;vertical-align:top;" |
! style="background-color:#E9E9E9;text-align:right;" |Votes
! style="background-color:#E9E9E9;text-align:right;" |% of vote
! style="background-color:#E9E9E9;text-align:right;" |+/–
! style="background-color:#E9E9E9;text-align:right;" |Seats
! style="background-color:#E9E9E9;text-align:right;" |% of seats
! style="background-color:#E9E9E9;text-align:right;" |+/–
|-
|- style="background-color:#F0F8FF;"
|-
|- style="background-color:#F0F8FF;"
|-
| style="text-align:left;" | Barisan Nasional: || 275,766 || 41.64 ||  || 25 || 59.5 ||5 
|-
| style="text-align:left;padding-left:1em;"| United Malays National Organisation (UMNO) || 220,715 || 33.32 ||  || 24 || 57.1  || 4 
|-
| style="text-align:left;padding-left:1em;"| Malaysian Chinese Association (MCA) || 40,241 || 6.08 ||  || 1 || 2.4 || 1
|-
| style="text-align:left;padding-left:1em;"| Malaysian Indian Congress (MIC) || 3,879 || 0.59  ||  || 0 || 0.0 || 
|-
| style="text-align:left;padding-left:1em;"| Malaysian People's Movement Party (GERAKAN) || 10,931 || 1.65 ||  || 0 || 0.0 || 
|-
| style="text-align:left;" | Pakatan Harapan: || 192,837 || 29.12 ||  || 9 || 21.4 ||
|-
| style="text-align:left;padding-left:1em;"| Democratic Action Party (DAP) || 71,396 || 10.78 ||  || 7 || 16.7  || 
|-
| style="text-align:left;padding-left:1em;"| People's Justice Party (PKR) || 64,338 || 9.71 ||  || 2 || 4.8 || 
|-
| style="text-align:left;padding-left:1em;"| Malaysian United Indigenous Party (PPBM) || 14,722 || 2.22 ||  || 0 || 0.0 || 
|-
| style="text-align:left;padding-left:1em;"| National Trust Party (AMANAH) || 42,381 || 6.40 ||  || 0 || 0.0 || 
|-
| style="text-align:left;" |Others || 192,432 || 29.05 ||  || 8 || 19.0 ||5
|-
| style="text-align:left;padding-left:1em;"| Pan-Malaysian Islamic Party (PAS) || 192,203|| 29.02 ||  || 8 || 19.0 || 5 
|-
| style="text-align:left;padding-left:1em;"| Parti Sosialis Malaysia (PSM) || 229 || 0.03 ||  || 0 || 0.0 ||  
|-
| style="text-align:left;padding-left:1em;"|Independents || 1,281 || 0.19 ||  || 0 || 0.0 ||  
|-
| style="text-align:left;" | Valid votes || 662,316 ||  ||style="background-color:#BAB9B9" rowspan="2" colspan="4"| 
|- 
| style="text-align:left;" | Invalid/blank votes || 11,065 || 
|- style="background-color:#F0F8FF;"
| style="text-align:left;" | Total votes || 673,381 ||  ||   ||  ||  ||  
|- style="background-color:#F0F8FF;"
| style="text-align:left;" | Registered voters || 823,981 ||  ||style="background-color:#BAB9B9" colspan="4"| 
|-
| style="text-align:left;" colspan=7 |
Source: undi.info
|}

Election pendulum

The 15th General Election witnessed 25 governmental seats and 17 non-governmental seats filled the Pahang State Legislative Assembly. The government side has 4 safe seats and 4 fairly safe seats, while the non-government side has just 1 safe seat and fairly safe seat each.

List of Assemblies

See also
 List of State Seats Representatives in Malaysia
 State legislative assemblies of Malaysia

References

External links
 Pahang State Government official website

 
P
Unicameral legislatures
Politics of Pahang